Galaxias parvirostris is an extinct species of bony fish in the genus Galaxias. It existed in what is now New Zealand in the early Miocene epoch. It was described by Werner Schwarzhans, R. Paul Scofield, Alan J. D. Tennyson, Jennifer P. Worthy and Trevor H. Worthy in 2012.

References

Miocene fish
Galaxias
Cenozoic animals of Australia